Road 18 is a road in northern Iran in Golestan Province and Mazandaran Province. In Golestan it connects Maravehtapeh to Kalaleh, Gonbad-e Qabus, Bandar Torkaman and Bandar-e-Gaz. In Mazandaran, it runs concurrent with Road 22 until Neka, where it turns towards Caspian Sea coastline and runs parallel to it going through Babolsar, Fereydunkenar and ends at Mahmudabad

References

External links 
 Iran road map on Young Journalists Club

Roads in Iran